is a metro station located in Kita ward, Sakai, Osaka Prefecture, Japan, operated by the Osaka Metro. It has the station number "M29".

Lines

Layout
The station consists of one underground island platform.

Platforms

History
Shinkanaoka Station opened on April 18, 1987.

The facilities of the Midosuji Line were inherited by Osaka Metro after the privatization of the Osaka Municipal Transportation Bureau on 1 April 2018.

Passenger statistics
In fiscal 2020, the station was used by an average of 18,868 passengers daily.

Surrounding area
 Sakai City Kita Ward Office
 Sakai City Shinkanaokahigashi Elementary School
 Osaka Labor Disaster Hospital
 Shinkanaoka Housing Complex

See also
 List of railway stations in Japan

References

External links

  

Osaka Metro stations
Railway stations in Japan opened in 1987
Railway stations in Osaka Prefecture
Sakai, Osaka